Antonina Pozharskaya was a Russian film actress.

Selected filmography 
 1909 — Song About the Merchant Kalashnikov
 1909 — 16th Century Russian Wedding
 1909 — Mazeppa
 1909 — Dead Souls
 1910 — The Idiot
 1910 — Queen of Spades
 1913 — Sorrows of Sarah

References

External links 
 АНТОНИНА ПОЖАРСКАЯ

Russian film actresses